Hyde is a surname derived from the unit of measurement hide. It may refer to:
 Alex Hyde-White, English actor
 Anne Hyde (1637–1671), English noblewoman, mother of two British queens, Mary II and Anne
 Anne Hyde (historian), American historian and writer
 Arthur M. Hyde (1877–1947), American politician, Governor of Missouri, U.S. Secretary of Agriculture
 Brandon Hyde (born 1973), American baseball coach
 Carlos Hyde (born 1990), American football player
 D. J. Hyde, ring name of professional wrestler David Markland
 DeWitt S. Hyde (1909–1987), American politician, congressman from Maryland (1953–1959)
 Douglas Hyde (1860–1949), Irish-language scholar, first President of Ireland, (1938–1945)
 Edith Hyde, better known as Edith Hyde Robbins Macartney (1895-1978), first holder of the Miss America title
 Edward Hyde, 1st Earl of Clarendon (1609–1674), English historian and statesman
 Edward Hyde, 3rd Earl of Clarendon (1661–1723), British nobleman, governor of New York and New Jersey
 Edward Hyde (1667–1712), Governor of North Carolina
 Edward Hyde (Cambridge cricketer)
 Formelda Hyde, American drag queen
 Frank Hyde (1916–2007), Australian rugby league footballer, coach and commentator
 Frank Hyde (footballer) (1927-2004), English footballer
 Glen and Bessie Hyde (both d. 1928), American couple lost in the Grand Canyon in 1928
 H. Montgomery Hyde (Harford Montgomery Hyde, 1907–1989), English author, lawyer
 Harry Hyde (1925–1996), crew chief in NASCAR stock car racing
 Helen Hyde (1868–1919, American etcher and engraver
 Henry Baldwin Hyde (1834–1899), American businessman
 Henry Hyde, 2nd Earl of Clarendon (1638–1709), British nobleman, Lord Privy Seal, Lord-Lieutenant of Ireland
 Henry Hyde, 4th Earl of Clarendon and 2nd Earl of Rochester (1672–1753), English nobleman and politician
 Henry Hyde, Viscount Cornbury (1710–1753), British nobleman
 Henry Hyde (1924–2007), American politician, congressman from Illinois
 Henry J. Hyde (Medal of Honor) (1846-1893), American soldier
 Ira B. Hyde (1838–1926), American politician, congressman from Missouri
 Jake Hyde (b. 1990), English professional footballer
 James Hyde (b. 1962), American soap-opera actor
 James Franklin Hyde (1903-1999), American chemist and inventor
 Jean-Guillaume, baron Hyde de Neuville (1776–1857), French politician
 John Nelson Hyde (1865–1912), American missionary
 Jonathan Hyde (b. 1947), Australian actor
 Kenneth Hyde (1930–86), English historian
 Laurance M. Hyde (1892–1978), American jurist, chief justice of the Missouri Supreme Court
 Laurence Hyde, 1st Earl of Rochester (1641–1711), English statesman and writer
 Lewis Hyde (b. 1945), American scholar and author
 Maria Jane Hyde (b. 1969), British musical actress
 Marie Agnes H. Hyde (1882-1978), American artist
 Marina Hyde (born 1974), English columnist
 Miriam Hyde (1913–2005), Australian composer, pianist, poet, and music educator
 Nicholas Hyde (d. 1631), British lawyer, Lord Chief Justice of England
 Orson Hyde (1805–1878), American Mormon, leader in the Latter Day Saint movement
Pearl Hyde (1904-1963), Lord Mayor of Coventry, England
 Randall Hyde (b. 1960), American programmer and author
 Rosel H. Hyde (1900-1992), American lawyer
 Sam Hyde (born 1993), English boxer
 Samuel C. Hyde (1842–1922), American politician, congressman from Washington (1895–1897)
 Samuel W. Hyde (b. 1985), American comedian, writer and actor
 Thomas Hyde (1637–1703), English orientalist
 Wilfrid Hyde-White (1903–1991), English actor
 William Hyde (journalist) (1835-1898)

See also 
 Hide (disambiguation)

English-language surnames
Hyde family